John David Coyne (born 18 July 1951) is a former professional footballer who played as a striker. Active as a professional in England, the United States and Australia, Coyne made over 150 career appearances. Born in England, he played international football for Australia.

Early and personal life
Born in Liverpool, England, he is the father of footballers Jamie Coyne and Chris Coyne.

Club career
Coyne played in England for Tranmere Rovers, Hartlepool United, Wigan Athletic (scoring twice in three Northern Premier League games) and Stockport County, making a combined total of 74 appearances in the Football League. Coyne also spent three seasons in the NASL, playing with the Boston Minutemen, the Dallas Tornado, the Toronto Metros-Croatia and the Hartford Bicentennials. Coyne ended his career in Australia, playing with Brisbane City, APIA Leichhardt and Forrestfield United.

International career
Coyne made his full international debut for Australia against Taiwan in Taipei in November 1979. He played the last of his four internationals in August 1980 against Mexico in Sydney. He also played four B-internationals for Australia in 1979 and 1980.

Coaching career
Coyne is currently an assistant coach at Perth SC in the Football West Premier League.

References

External links
 

1951 births
Living people
Footballers from Liverpool
Association football forwards
English footballers
Australian soccer players
Australia international soccer players
Tranmere Rovers F.C. players
Hartlepool United F.C. players
Boston Minutemen players
Dallas Tornado players
Toronto Blizzard (1971–1984) players
Wigan Athletic F.C. players
Stockport County F.C. players
Connecticut Bicentennials players
Brisbane City FC players
APIA Leichhardt FC players
Forrestfield United SC players
English Football League players
North American Soccer League (1968–1984) players
National Soccer League (Australia) players
English expatriate sportspeople in the United States
Expatriate soccer players in the United States
English expatriate footballers
English expatriate sportspeople in Canada
Expatriate soccer players in Canada
English emigrants to Australia
Northern Premier League players